Funky T. Cool T. is the fifth album Lester Bowie recorded for the Japanese DIW label and the second album by his "New York Organ Ensemble". It was released in 1991 and features performances by Bowie, Steve Turre, Amina Claudine Myers James Carter, Phillip Wilson and Famoudou Don Moye.

Reception
The Allmusic review by Don Snowden awarded the album 2½ stars stating "it really seems like Lester Bowie threw this group away -- too bad, because the combination of his sensibility, this genre, and these players had a lot of potential".

Track listing
 "Funky T." (Turre) - 8:04  
 "What's New?" (Burke, Haggart) - 9:05  
 "When the Spirit Returns" - 9:16  
 "Cool T." - 10:42  
 "Afternoon in Brooklyn" - 10:57  
All compositions by Lester Bowie except as indicated
Recorded at Systems Two, Brooklyn, NY on 14, 15 & 16 January 1991

Personnel
Lester Bowie: trumpet, flugelhorn
Steve Turre: trombone 
Amina Claudine Myers: organ, vocals 
James Carter: tenor saxophone 
Famoudou Don Moye: drums, percussion  
Phillip Wilson: drums

References

1991 albums
DIW Records albums
Lester Bowie albums